NGC 6044 is a lenticular galaxy located about 465 million light-years away in the constellation Hercules. NGC 6044 was discovered by astronomer Lewis Swift on June 27, 1886. It was then rediscovered by astronomer Guillaume Bigourdan on June 8, 1888. NGC 6044 is a member of the Hercules Cluster.

See also
 List of NGC objects (6001–7000)
 NGC 6039

References

External links

Hercules (constellation)
Lenticular galaxies
6044
IC objects
057015
Astronomical objects discovered in 1886
Hercules Cluster
Discoveries by Lewis Swift